Lybia is a genus of small crabs in the family Xanthidae. Their common names include boxer crabs, boxing crabs and pom-pom crabs. They are notable for their mutualism with sea anemones, which they hold in their claws for defense. In return, the anemones get carried around which may enable them to capture more food particles with their tentacles. Boxer crabs use at least three species of anemones, including Bundeopsis spp. and Triactis producta. The bonding with the anemone is not needed for survival, however, and boxer crabs have frequently been known to live without them, sometimes substituting other organisms such as sponges and corals for the sea anemones.

The genus Lybia contains the following species:

L. australiensis (Ward, 1933).
L. caestifera (Alcock, 1898).
L. denticulata (Nobili, 1905).
L. edmondsoni (Takeda & Miyake, 1970).
L. hatagumoana (Sakai, 1961).
L. leptochelis (Zehntner, 1894).
L. plumosa (Barnard, 1947)
L. pugil (Alcock, 1898).
L. tessellata (Latreille in Milbert, 1812).
Lybia tutelina (C. G. S. Tan & Ng, 1994).

References

External links

Boxer Crab, Lybia tesselata. Aquarium World

Xanthoidea
Crustacean genera
Taxa named by Henri Milne-Edwards